ULS Airlines Cargo, formerly Kuzu Airlines Cargo, is a Turkish cargo airline headquartered in Istanbul with its main base at Istanbul Airport. It operates international freight services.

History
The airline was established in early 2004 and started operations in June 2004. It was originally named Baron Hava Kargo, but was rebranded and renamed to Kuzu Airlines Cargo in October 2004. It is now owned by the ULS (Universal Logistics Systems) Group and has 220 employees (as of June 2009). During late 2008 and early 2009, three Airbus A310 aircraft were added to the fleet from Emirates SkyCargo. In July 2009, Kuzu Airlines Cargo formally changed its name to ULS Airlines Cargo under a new operator's certificate.

Destinations
ULS Airlines Cargo operates regular cargo flights from its main base to Lennart Meri Tallinn Airport in Estonia, as well as to destinations in the Subcontinent, Far and Middle East, Europe, Africa and North America. It also serves a number of international destinations through interline agreements with other carriers.

Fleet

As of October 2021, the ULS Airlines Cargo fleet consists of the following freighter aircraft:

References

External links

Official website

Airlines established in 2004
Airlines of Turkey
Cargo airlines of Turkey
Companies based in Istanbul
Turkish companies established in 2004